Getinge is a locality situated in Halmstad Municipality, Halland County, Sweden, with 1,843 inhabitants in 2010.

Economy
Getinge Group had its headquarters in the village until 2014.

History
The local assembly, the Hallandic thing took place in Getinge.

References 

Populated places in Halmstad Municipality